Manuel Lopes was Seattle's first black resident whose identity is known, as well as its first barber.

Biography
Born in the Island of Fogo in the Cape Verde Islands in roughly 1812, Lopes arrived in the United States on a whaling ship. According to the history of Cape Verde in "1810 whaling ships from Massachusetts and Rhode Island in the United States recruited crews from the islands of Brava and Fogo." He first settled in Maine and then in Massachusetts, in the city of New Bedford.  He married Susannah Jones in 1841 at New Bedford, Massachusetts and they had a son William H Lopes.

In 1858, he arrived in Seattle approximately seven years after the founding of Seattle. His wife died shortly after he left Massachusetts. Lopes became the city's first black resident and its first barber. Additionally, as a propertied individual, he ran a restaurant on Commercial Street (later First Ave South) in the same building where he lived and plied his barber trade.

Lopes was a musician and known to signal mealtimes by marching up and down Seattle's main thoroughfare, beating out a rhythm on a snare drum. He similarly headed parades celebrating Independence Day in the US.

In the early 1870s, Lopes ultimately moved to Port Gamble, Washington in search of work as a result of one of many economic downturns that struck Seattle. Later in life, he apparently suffered from dropsy, for which he was admitted to Providence Hospital in 1885.

Lopes died at Providence Hospital, Seattle, Washington on December 23, 1895 after a long illness.

References

Sources
 Lindley, Robin. (2013, April 3). "Slavery? Yes, it did happen here. As did escapes." Retrieved from Crosscut.
 Quintard Taylor. The Forging of a Black Community: Seattle's Central District from 1870 through the Civil Rights Era. Seattle and London: University of Washington Press, 1994.
 Paul De Barros. Jackson Street After Hours: The Roots of Jazz in Seattle. Seattle: Sasquatch Books, 1993.
 Seattle Times article
 Manuel Lopes biography
 Seattle Post Intelligencer article

1810s births
Year of birth uncertain
1895 deaths
Barbers
Businesspeople from Seattle
History of Washington (state)
Cape Verdean emigrants to the United States
19th-century American businesspeople

American people of Cape Verdean descent